is a railway station in Nagata-ku, Kobe, Hyōgo Prefecture, Japan.

Lines
Kobe Electric Railway
Arima Line

Adjacent stations

Railway stations in Hyōgo Prefecture
Stations of Kobe Electric Railway
Railway stations in Japan opened in 1928